Pai Hsiao-yen (23 June 1980 – 20 April 1997) was the only daughter of popular Taiwanese TV host and actress Pai Bing-bing and Japanese author Ikki Kajiwara.

Abduction, murder, and island-wide manhunt

Abduction
Pai Hsiao-yen disappeared after leaving for her school, Hsing Wu High School, on the morning of April 14, 1997. Her family received a ransom note demanding  along with a severed piece of her little finger and a photograph of a bound girl.

Press in Taiwan first reported the incident on April 23, 1997, which contradicted the accepted practice of reporting the kidnapping after its resolution. Some of the pre-planned ransom drops were aborted when kidnappers spotted police and media tailing Pai Bing-bing. However, after the abductors negotiated with the police for 11 days and changed the locations of payment more than 20 times, the police finally decoded the communication methods used by the abductors. In the subsequent police raid, one suspect was arrested while two others escaped after an intense gun fight with the police.

Murder
Pai Hsiao-yen's mutilated body, weighted down with dumbbells, was found in a drainage ditch in Zhonggang Dapai, Taishan Township on April 28, 1997. Investigators said that she had been dead for ten days before her body's discovery. Ransom negotiations had continued after the likely time of Pai's death; an impersonator placed a telephone call to give Pai Bing-bing the impression that her daughter was alive. Tim Healy and Laurie Underwood of Asiaweek said that Pai was "apparently tortured" before her death. The photograph of her naked dead body was leaked to the mass media, including the China Times, which printed it.

Twelve suspects  were arrested, but three of the main criminals, Chen Chien-hsing, Lin Chun-sheng, and Kao Tien-meen escaped. A fourth person, Chang Chih-huei (Chen's brother-in-law) was suspected of involvement, but his sentence was eventually overturned due to insufficient evidence. An island-wide manhunt began and the police were ordered to fatally shoot and kill the suspects without warning if they showed any sign of resistance.

National manhunt
While being pursued, the trio abducted Taipei County councilor Tsai Ming-tang in June 1997 and a businessman surnamed Chen in August 1997. On August 19, the trio was spotted by two foot patrol police officers on Wuchang Street (五常街) in Taipei's Zhongshan District. A brief exchange of gun fire ensued and Lin turned the gun on himself after he was shot six times; one of the officers was killed and the other one was wounded. Lin died around 11:55 AM. Reinforcement was immediately rushed to the neighborhood, and more than 800 officers conducted a thorough search, which turned up nothing.

On October 23, Kao and Chen shot and killed a plastic surgeon, his wife, and a nurse after forcing them to perform plastic surgery on them. Kao and Chen eluded a massive police search in early November 1997. A few days later, Kao was spotted by the police and shot himself when police attempted to arrest him on November 17.

The last criminal, Chen Chin-hsing, broke into the residence of Colonel Edward McGill Alexander, South African military attaché to Taipei, and took the family hostage on November 18, but eventually surrendered to the police after negotiation initiated by politician Frank Hsieh. After being granted media access, Chen confessed to the April kidnapping and other crimes. Chen was executed on October 6, 1999, after being convicted in December 1998 for kidnappings, murders, and multiple counts of sexual assaults.

Protests and resignations
Demonstrators marched on 4 May 1997 and 18 May 1997, demanding Premier Lien Chan's resignation, partially over the rise in violent crime as evidenced by the then-unsolved murders of Pai, Peng Wan-ru, and Liu Pang-yu. Eight media organizations, including the China Times, which ran the photograph of Pai's body, were condemned during the first protest.

President Lee Teng-hui offered an apology on 15 May 1997, stating Lien would be relieved of his duty as premier and the Cabinet would be reshuffled. Ma Ying-jeou, who was serving as Minister without Portfolio, resigned following the first protest. Lin Fong-cheng, who was serving as Minister of the Interior, also resigned his post following the first protest. Lien Chan resigned his post as Premier on 22 August 1997, as did the director-general of the National Police Agency, Yao Kao-chiao. Lien had repeatedly offered to resign from his other office as Vice President in the wake of the protests; eventually he retained this office until the term ended.

See also
List of kidnappings
List of solved missing person cases

References

External links

 
 
 
 

1990s murders in Taiwan
1997 crimes in Taiwan
1997 deaths
1997 murders in Asia
April 1997 events in Asia
April 1997 crimes
Deaths by person in Asia
Female murder victims
Formerly missing people
Incidents of violence against girls
Incidents of violence against women
Kidnapping in Taiwan
Kidnapping in the 1990s
Missing person cases in Taiwan
Murdered Taiwanese children
People murdered in Taiwan
Taiwanese murder victims
Taiwanese people of Japanese descent
Murder in Taiwan
Torture victims
Violence against women in Taiwan